Bethel Music en Español is the first album in Spanish by California-based worship collective Bethel Music, and their seventeenth album overall. The album was released on February 15, 2019, through its own imprint label, Bethel Music. The featured Bethel Music worship leaders on the album are Josh Baldwin, Cory Asbury, Jonathan David & Melissa Helser, Bethany Wohrle, Brian Johnson, Jenn Johnson, Kalley Heiligenthal, Paul McClure, Hunter G K Thompson and Steffany Gretzinger with guest appearances from Christine D'Clario, Edward Rivera, Raquel Vega and Marco Barrientos. Jose Olide and Paul Pineda handled the production of the album.

Background
Bethel Music en Español is the first album by Bethel Music to be recorded in Spanish as well as the first album by the collective to be recorded in a language other than English. The album is a collection of previously released Bethel Music songs.

Artwork
Stephen James Hart, the Art Director and Visual Worship Leader for Bethel Music, shared on his blog the story of the album artwork for Bethel Music en Español. The final album cover is a photograph of Melissa Helser leading worship live with the type encased in boxes alluding to the cover design era of the 1990s and 2000s. The concept captures the legacy of revival and worship in Latin America as well as the essence of Bethel Music's worship, which is "the Spirit of God flowing through our offering of surrender, all centred around Jesus and the cross."

Release and promotion
Bethel Music began teasing the album on social media in September 2018. A short video cip titled Bethel Music en Español which shows Steffany Gretzinger singing the song "Pieces" in Spanish was published on Bethel Music's YouTube channel. An Instagram account with the same name was launched, with images of Spanish titles for previously released Bethel Music songs and additional video teasers being uploaded there. On February 1, 2019, Bethel Music launched the album pre-order with the release of three promotional singles: "Por Siempre" featuring Kalley Heiligenthal; "Promesas No Fallarán" featuring Christine D'Clario; and "Mi Esperanza Está en Jesús" featuring Bethany Wohrle. The album was slated for release on February 15, 2019.

Critical reception

Reviewing for 365 Days of Inspiring Media, Jonathan Andre rated Bethel Music en Español four and a half stars out of five, stating that the album will be enjoy by its Spanish speaking community and fans of Bethel's previous release, and described it as "a unique representation of what worship music could sound like if sung by someone else in another country."

Commercial performance
In the United States, Bethel Music en Español debuted at No. 16 on the Latin Pop Albums chart dated March 2, 2019 published by Billboard.

Track listing

NOTE:  These songs are Spanish-language translations of Bethel Music songs in English.  The original English-language song is listed next to each title.

Personnel
Adapted from AllMusic.

 Eric Allen — artist direction, director
 Keila Alvarado — background vocals
 Cory Asbury — primary artist, vocals
 Josh Baldwin — primary artist, vocals
 Marco Barrientos — featured artist, vocals
 Robby Busick ——production manager
 Joe Creppell — mastering
 Christine D'Clario — adaptation, executive producer, primary artist, vocals
 Kristene DiMarco — primary Artist, vocals
 Chris Estes — director
 Chris Greely — programming, string arrangements, synthesizer arrangements
 Steffany Gretzinger — primary artist, vocals
 Stephen Hart — art direction, design
 Kalley Heiligenthal — primary artist, vocals
 Jonathan David Helser — primary artist, vocals
 Melissa Helser — primary artist, vocals
 Luke Hendrickson — piano
 Jenny Hislop — production manager
 Hannah Holland — background vocals
 Brian Johnson — executive producer, primary artist, vocals
 Jenn Johnson — primary artist, vocals
 Lemuel Marín — adaptation, piano
 Paul McClure — primary artist, vocals
 Mathew Ogden — bass
 José Olide — adaptation, creative director, drums, executive producer, producer
 Paul Piñeda — producer
 Michael Pope — guitar
 Justin Posey — cover photo
 Edward Rivera — adaptation, background vocals, featured artist, primary artist, vocals
 Bobby Strand — programming, string arrangements, synthesizer arrangements
 Joel Taylor — executive producer
 Dafydd Thomas	— mixing
 Hunter Thompson primary artist, vocals
 Raquel Vega — featured artist, vocals
 Joe Volk — drums
 Bethany Wohrle — primary artist, vocals

Charts

Release history

References

External links
 

2019 albums
Spanish-language albums
Bethel Music albums